John Veron  (born 1945), complete name John Edward Norwood Veron, credited in research as J. E. N. Veron, and in other writing as Charlie Veron, is a biologist, taxonomist, and specialist in the study of corals and reefs. He is believed to have discovered more than 20% of the world's coral species.

Early life
John Edward Norwood Veron (known as "Charlie" due to his interest in the natural sciences at school) was born in 1945 in Sydney. He attended Barker College in Sydney. He won a Commonwealth scholarship as a gifted child and went on study at the University of New England. His main interests were in the natural world, especially marine life. He participated in the scuba club while at university.

His honours thesis was on the behaviour of gliding possums. He took his M.Sc. with a study on the temperature regulation of lizards. Veron completed his PhD with a study on the neurophysiology of dragonflies.

Career 
After taking his PhD in 1971, Veron was offered a postdoctoral position at James Cook University to study corals. Veron was the first full-time researcher on the Great Barrier Reef (1972) and the first scientist employed by the Australian Institute of Marine Science (1974). He participated in 67 expeditions to all the major reef provinces in the world. He credited "Red" Gilmartin and John W. Wells from Cornell University as key figures in clarifying his interest in taxonomy in the 1970s.

Veron named about 20% of reef corals and built a taxonomic framework for corals that is used throughout the world.
He founded the Orpheus Island Marine Station. He discovered and delineated the Coral Triangle. 
He introduced the concept of reticulate evolution to the marine world.

Recognition 
He has many professional awards, including:

 Scientific Diving Lifetime Achievement Award (American Academy of Underwater Sciences)
 Darwin Medal (International Society for Reef Studies) 
 Silver Jubilee Pin (Australian Marine Sciences Association)
Medal of the Order of Australia for "service to marine research", 2021

Writings
Veron has written many books and monographs about corals and coral reefs, including:

Later life
Since 2008 he together with colleagues have been producing an open access website about coral taxonomy, biogeography and identification, Corals of The World (www.coralsoftheworld.org). The website includes a mapping program called Coral Geographic and an identification program called CoralID. He has campaigned extensively on climate change, mass bleaching of coral reefs, ocean acidification and related environmental issues.

In 2009, Sir David Attenborough introduced Veron's lecture to the Royal Society.

He was featured in the 2017 documentary Chasing Coral.

A sculpture of John 'Charlie' Veron, 'The Godfather of Coral' was created by Jason deCaires Taylor for the Museum of Underwater Art as part of the Ocean Sentinels above the surface exhibition in 2022

References

External links 
 Corals of the World

Australian marine biologists
21st-century Australian zoologists
Marine zoologists
1945 births
Living people
20th-century Australian zoologists
Recipients of the Medal of the Order of Australia